Jack Middleton (28 April 1917 – 1 January 2010) was a British swimmer. He competed in the men's 100 metre backstroke at the 1936 Summer Olympics.

References

1917 births
2010 deaths
British male swimmers
Olympic swimmers of Great Britain
Swimmers at the 1936 Summer Olympics
Sportspeople from Tamworth, Staffordshire
British male backstroke swimmers